Jacob Lyda (born May 18, 1975) is an American country music singer. His first four albums were produced by Mike Headrick for BGR Records/Country Discovery Records 1995–2003. He is now signed to Davis Music Group and is being promoted by Nine North Records. In early 2011, Lyda released his debut single "I'm Doin' Alright", which has charted on Hot Country Songs. Lyda co-wrote the song with Paul Overstreet.

The song was to have been included on his album Another Song I Just Had to Write.

Karlie Justus of Engine 145 gave the song a "thumbs up", saying that the song was "something greater than the sum of its parts". She praised its sound and the "charisma" in Lyda's voice.

Discography

Albums
 1995 - My Dreams Just Came True - BGR 9502
 1997 - Here We Go Again - BGR 9509
 1998 - Three Times the Charm - BGR/Country Discovery CD1103
 2003 - Back in the Swing - Country Discovery CD1052

Singles

Music videos

References

External links

American country singer-songwriters
People from Stevenson, Alabama
American male singer-songwriters
Living people
1975 births
21st-century American singers
Country musicians from Alabama
21st-century American male singers
Singer-songwriters from Alabama